Joe Mark Hancott (6born 8 March 2001) is an English  footballer who plays for Newport (IOW) as a left-back and centre back.

Career

Portsmouth
On 16 August 2017, Hancott made his Portsmouth debut playing in a 3–3 draw with Fulham U21s in the EFL Trophy. Hancott became Pompey's youngest ever debutant at 16 years and 161 days beating the record previously held by Gary O'Neil.

On 2 March 2019, Hancott signed for Basingstoke Town F.C., on a loan deal until the end of the season but returned to Portsmouth without making a single appearance.

On 30 April 2019, Hancott was offered a third year scholarship with Portsmouth.

In September 2019, Hancott joined Bognor Regis Town on loan.

In October 2019, Hancott suffered a season-ending ACL injury in his right knee. In the summer of 2020, his scholarship was extended by six months to give him a chance to prove he had recovered from his injury and that he deserved a longer deal. 

Hancott was released by the club in March 2021.

Bognor Regis Town
On 26 March 2021, Hancott signed for Bognor Regis Town.

Newport IOW
On 20 November 2021, Hancott signed for Wessex Football League Division One club Newport (IOW).

Career statistics

References

Living people
2001 births
English footballers
Association football defenders
Portsmouth F.C. players
Basingstoke Town F.C. players
Bognor Regis Town F.C. players
Southern Football League players
Isthmian League players
Footballers from the Isle of Wight